The Mizoram Post is an English-language daily newspaper in Mizoram, India. It is published from Silchar, Assam, India. In 2007, the Government of India's Directorate of Advertising and Visual Publicity (DAVP) accredited it as the most circulated newspaper in Mizoram. It had circulation of around 59,500 in 2008. Along with Newslink and Highlander, it is one of the three prominent dailies in Mizoram.

References

External links 
 

English-language newspapers published in India
Newspapers published in Assam